The 1993 Peach Bowl, part of the 1992–92 bowl game season, featured the Mississippi State Bulldogs and the North Carolina Tar Heels. It was the first Peach Bowl played at the Georgia Dome after 20 years at Atlanta–Fulton County Stadium.

North Carolina came from behind for the win after trailing 14–0 after a quarter of play. Mississippi State missed chances to extend its lead in the second quarter when two touchdowns were scuttled by holding penalties. The Tar Heels then drove 82 yards to open the second half and Natrone Means pounded in the score, UNC's only offensive touchdown of the day. Means finished with 128 yards.

Bracey Walker blocked two punts, including one for a 24-yard scoring return that tied the game at 14 in the third quarter. The defensive MVP also laid a big hit to key a 44-yard interception return by teammate Cliff Baskervillle for the go-ahead TD in the fourth quarter. MSU added a late field goal, but turned the ball over via interception and downs inside the Tar Heels' 30 on two late drives.

References

Peach Bowl
Peach Bowl
Mississippi State Bulldogs football bowl games
North Carolina Tar Heels football bowl games
January 1993 sports events in the United States
1993 in sports in Georgia (U.S. state)
1993 in Atlanta